"Chinese, Japanese, dirty knees, look at these" is a racist playground chant in the United States used to mock children of Asian origin.

One rendering of the chant gives it as "Chinese/Japanese/Dirty Knees/Look at these Chinese Japanese/Dirty Knees". A 2005 Pop Culture Encyclopedia of the Late 20th Century, mentioning it among "fifty well-known jingles, jump-rope rhymes, and singsong parodies that we kids chanted", lists it as Chinese, Japanese, dirty knees / Look at these.' (Point to your tits.)"

Many Asian Americans recalled being taunted or bullied with this chant in their youth in the 20th century. Children who sang it would sometimes pull their eyes into slits to make clear the object of their contempt. Gregory B. Lee, writing that "many a Chinese immigrant child over the past 100 years has had to endure" the chant, notes that "[t]he allusion to dirt in this ditty is not aleatory", linking it to the stereotype of unclean "Orientals". 

In 2020, the film Monster Hunter caused an uproar on Chinese social media because of what was seen as a reference to the chant. In a scene, MC Jin's character jokingly asks: "Look at my knees!", and to the question "What kind of knees are these?", he replies: "Chi-knees!". The film was removed from circulation, and Chinese authorities censored references to it online.

References 

Anti–East Asian sentiment in the United States
Playground songs
American children's songs
Songs about China
Songs about Japan
Songs about East Asian people
Ethnic humour
Race-related controversies in music